His Birthright is a 1918 American drama film directed by William Worthington for Haworth Pictures Corporation. Sessue Hayakawa produced the film and played the lead role. The rest of the cast includes Marin Sais, Howard Davies, Mary Anderson, and Hayakawa's wife Tsuru Aoki.

Plot
As described in a film magazine, Yukio is a Japanese-American whose father, a naval officer, failed to return to his mother after the honeymoon. The mother commits harakiri and the son becomes determined to kill his father and goes to America. Influenced by a female German spy, Yukio steals an important document from his father, who is now an admiral. Rebuffed by the woman and ashamed to have sunk to the level of a thief, he then decides to recover the paper. He does so after a desperate battle with the woman's colleagues and returns the document to his father, who descends upon the place with police and captures the spies. Yukio announces that he came to take his father's life, but the admiral tells him that he loved Yukio's mother and did not return to her as he could not find her. Taking his place as the admiral's son, Yukio is now determined to join the U.S. army and fight in World War I, a cause in which Japan and America are united.

Cast
Sessue Hayakawa as Yukio
Marin Sais as Edna Kingston
Howard Davies as Adm. John Milton
Mary Anderson as Helen Milton
Tsuru Aoki as Saki San
Sidney De Gray as James Barnes (credited as Sydney De Grey)
Harry von Meter as Adm. von Krug
Mayme Kelso as Mrs. Harland Smith

Preservation
A partial copy with three reels exists at the EYE Film Instituut Nederland film archive.

References

External links 

 

1918 drama films
1918 films
Silent American drama films
American silent feature films
Films directed by William Worthington
American black-and-white films
Haworth Pictures Corporation films
Mutual Film films
1910s American films